Gloria Jean (born Gloria Jean Schoonover; April 14, 1926 – August 31, 2018) was an American actress and singer who starred or co-starred in 26 feature films from 1939 to 1959, and made numerous radio, television, stage, and nightclub appearances. She is probably best remembered today for her appearance with  W. C. Fields in the film Never Give a Sucker an Even Break (1941).

Early years
Gloria Jean was born Gloria Jean Schoonover in Buffalo, New York, the daughter of Ferman and Eleanor Schoonover; her ancestry was Pennsylvania Dutch. She had three sisters, Sally, Lois, and Bonnie. The family was involved in her career, with Lois serving as stand-in for the actress and their father managing her career. Gloria Jean was three years old when she first sang on radio, under the name "Baby Skylark."

Singing
The family moved to Scranton, Pennsylvania, where Gloria Jean sang with Paul Whiteman's orchestra on radio broadcasts. When she was 12, "she was engaged by a smallish New York opera company and became the youngest member of an opera troupe in the United States."

Film

Universal
Gloria Jean was being trained as a coloratura soprano when her voice teacher, Leah Russel, took her to an audition held by Universal Pictures movie producer Joe Pasternak in 1938. Pasternak had guided Deanna Durbin to stardom, and with Durbin now advancing to ingénue roles, Pasternak wanted a younger singer to make the same kind of musicals. He held auditions for a film called The Under-Pup.

"There were hundreds of beautiful little girls there," Jean recalled. "I had been grabbed out of the sandbox, and I didn't look so nice. I had pigtails and my teeth were a little crooked. But that's what Joe liked."

She told Pasternak she could not sing as the piano was out of tune. "My mother almost shot me. Joe said, `I like this kid. Let's get the piano tuned and bring her back tomorrow.' I got all kinds of lectures on the way home about being a little more subdued. When I sang the next day, I knew it went very well". Up against hundreds of others, Gloria Jean won the audition.

Under contract to Universal, she was given the leading role in the feature The Under-Pup (1939), which starred Robert Cummings and Nan Grey who had been in Three Smart Girls Grow Up with Durbin. The film did well and Gloria Jean became instantly popular with moviegoers. Universal's publicity department initially claimed the singer was 11 years old instead of 13; her actual age was not well known for many decades.

She co-starred with Bing Crosby in If I Had My Way (1940) which was written, produced and directed by David Butler. She then starred in the well-received A Little Bit of Heaven (1940), which reunited her with many from the Under-Pup cast, including Nan Grey; the male lead was Robert Stack who appeared opposite Durbin several times.

Her fourth picture became her best known: Never Give a Sucker an Even Break (1941), in which she co-starred with W.C. Fields. "He had a reputation, I know, for not liking children, but he was very kind and considerate to me," said Gloria later. "I used to wonder, though, why he didn't eat on the set. When we broke for a meal he'd say, 'Get that kid off to school.' Of course, I know now, it was because he wanted to drink."

In December 1940 she was sued by William Lustig, a Pennsylvania bandleader who had appeared with her during her local radio years; Lustig claimed to be her former agent.

Youth musicals
Universal recognized the need for musical entertainment during wartime, and Gloria Jean became one of the studio's most prolific performers; during the war years she made 14 feature films. Most were "hepcat" musicals, which were geared to the teenage market of the day, and Universal often used them to introduce new young talent, including Donald O'Connor, Peggy Ryan, Mel Tormé, and Marshall Thompson. She supported The Andrews Sisters in What's Cookin' (1942) then appeared with Donald O'Connor, Jane Frazee, Robert Paige and Peggy Ryan in Get Hep to Love (1942). It was directed by Charles Lamont as was When Johnny Comes Marching Home (1942) with O'Connor, Ryan, Frazee, and Allan Jones. She and O'Connor were top-billed in It Comes Up Love (1943) and Mister Big (1943). She was in Moonlight in Vermont (1943) with Ray Malone.

She was cast, in her first dramatic performance, as a blind girl in one of four vignettes for Julien Duvivier's Flesh and Fantasy (1943). The studio started admitting her real age. Her performance won raves at the film's advance preview, and her segment was the best-received of the four. However, Universal removed the half-hour sequence and shelved it, at the insistence of a major stockholder who exerted a great deal of control at the studio. Gloria said this decision was a "heartbreak... because the part I played in that really meant a lot to me. It was the first I'd ever done with real drama."

Universal tried to give Gloria Jean a smooth transition from adolescent roles to leading-lady status; she was outgrowing juvenile roles but was not yet mature enough for adult leads. In December 1942 she was tested for the female lead in Phantom of the Opera, but was considered too young. She was then considered as the singing ingenue in a concurrent Abbott and Costello comedy, It Ain't Hay (released 1943) but was considered too old.

In January 1944 Universal announced they wanted to launch Gloria Jean as a more adult star and were developing "three or four stories". Resuming her string of musicals, Gloria Jean co-starred with Olsen and Johnson in the big-budget Ghost Catchers (1944), which featured singer-actor Kirby Grant. The two vocalists worked so well together that Universal teamed them for two more features. She starred in Pardon My Rhythm (1944) opposite Mel Torme, Reckless Age (1944) and I'll Remember April (1945) with Kirby Grant. In May 1944 she turned eighteen.

When Gloria Jean's Universal contract expired at the end of 1944, her agent Eddie Sherman (who was also Abbott and Costello's manager) persuaded her against renewing it, citing the need for "a transition period to make the change from child to adult roles." This left Universal in a bind; the studio had already promised exhibitors three Gloria Jean pictures for the 1945 season. Universal solved the problem by rushing Gloria Jean through three final productions that had already been partially completed. The half-hour sequence from Flesh and Fantasy was expanded into a feature-length melodrama, Destiny (1944); and scripts had already been prepared for Fairy Tale Murder (1945) (released in the United States as River Gang) and Easy to Look At (1945) (co-starring Kirby Grant).

Arthur Dreifuss Films
After leaving Universal, Gloria Jean made personal appearances across America; the successful tour prompted a new tour of Europe. In England, her rendition of "The Lord's Prayer" (and the lyric "forgive us our debts") was taken by some critics as a pointed comment about America's lend-lease policy. "It was all over the newspapers the next day, the story that I had come to London to insult Britons," said Gloria. "I was devastated." Thus the European tour ended abruptly and Gloria Jean returned to Hollywood.

Her family lawyer had vanished with her earnings and she was heavily in debt to the US tax authorities. To make matters worse, no directors wanted the former child star. "It was a mistake for me to stay away from Hollywood that long," she admitted in 1960. "You can easily be forgotten."

She resumed her movie career as a freelance performer appearing in United Artists, Columbia Pictures, and Allied Artists productions, the best-known being Copacabana (1947) with Groucho Marx. Four of her later films were directed by Arthur Dreifuss: I Surrender Dear (1948) and Manhattan Angel (1949) for Sam Katzman. then the Dreifuss-produced An Old-Fashioned Girl (1949) for Eagle Lion and There's a Girl in My Heart (1949) for Allied Artists.

Television
Gloria Jean began appearing on TV shows like Hollywood Theatre Time, Rebound, Death Valley Days, Hallmark Hall of Fame, The Colgate Comedy Hour, Your Favorite Story, Annie Oakley, and Lux Video Theatre. Her best-known performances of the early 1950s are six Snader Telescriptions (three-minute musicals syndicated for television), later compiled into the TV series Showtime.

She also continued to appear in feature films, albeit low-budget ones. Wonder Valley (1953), produced on location in Arkansas, was Gloria Jean's first color movie and is now a lost film. Her next feature was Air Strike (1955), a minor military drama.

After Air Strike Gloria Jean was hired by the owner of the Tahitian restaurant in Studio City, California as a hostess, greeting and seating dinner guests. She enjoyed the experience and occasionally ran the restaurant in her employer's absence. Show-business patrons were surprised that a film star was now involved in restaurant work, resulting in sympathetic feature stories in the national press.

Veteran Hollywood producer Edward Finney, himself a Gloria Jean fan, saw one of these reports and hired her to star in the lightweight comedy Laffing Time (filmed in 1959, re-released as The Madcaps in 1964). Jerry Lewis also read that Gloria Jean was working in a restaurant, and signed her for a singing role in his latest production, The Ladies Man (1961). Lewis removed almost all of her footage from the finished film; she appears only as an extra and has no dialogue. It was her last theatrical motion picture.

Her final appearances were in The Dick Powell Theatre, Lockup, and Saints and Sinners.

Personal life
Newspaper columnist Bob Thomas reported that Gloria was engaged to a pilot, but he was killed in the Korean War. Gloria herself denied this, dismissing it as mistaken identity.

In 1962 she married Franco Cellini, an actor, but he was often away. By 1966 they were divorced. "I seem to attract the drips and the drunks," she said. The union produced a son, Angelo.

She had problems with the IRS.  "Seems there had been a lot of mistakes in old income tax returns," she says. "So the Internal Revenue Service came along and seized all my assets. Everything... I decided, unlike so many other child stars, that instead of just sitting around waiting for work in the acting business, I'd pick myself up and go out and get a job. "

In 1965 she signed on with an employment agency, which sent her to Redken Cosmetics, where she worked as a receptionist until 1993.

"I'm very happy," she said in 1986. "I feel I had a wonderful past and I have a contented, happy present."

Revived interest in her life and films
In December 1991, Gloria Jean was honored by the Young Artist Foundation with its Former Child Star "Lifetime Achievement" Award, recognizing her achievements within the film industry as a juvenile performer. Gloria Jean also participated in various nostalgia and autograph shows, meeting fans and displaying memorabilia. She had always retained her fan following, and corresponded steadily with friends and admirers for the rest of her life.

Gloria Jean's films are beginning to receive new exposure: If I Had My Way has been restored to its original length and issued on DVD, followed by the DVD release of Never Give a Sucker an Even Break. (Latter-day documentaries about W. C. Fields include recent clips of Gloria Jean, reminiscing about working with him.) Universal Pictures has struck new 35-mm prints of Mister Big and Get Hep to Love for theatrical use. Her 1947 film Copacabana is available on home video.

Final years
After her retirement from Redken, Gloria Jean lived in California with her sister, Bonnie. After Bonnie died in 2007 she moved to Hawaii to live with her son Angelo and his family. (Angelo died in 2017.) Very late in life she suffered health problems, including two serious falls that slowed her mobility, and a heart condition. She died of heart failure and pneumonia on August 31, 2018 in a hospital near her home in Mountain View, Hawaii. She is survived by her daughter-in-law and four grandchildren.

Her authorized biography, Gloria Jean: A Little Bit of Heaven, was published in 2005. A tribute website, GloriaJeanSings.com, followed, also with Gloria Jean's cooperation. Her Internet presence includes a series of videos showing the actress as she appeared in recent years.

Filmography

Radio appearances

References

External links

 Gloria Jean Sings: tribute website with clips

1926 births
2018 deaths
Actresses from Pennsylvania
American child actresses
American women singers
American film actresses
American radio actresses
Actresses from Buffalo, New York
Actors from Scranton, Pennsylvania
Musicians from Scranton, Pennsylvania
20th-century American actresses
21st-century American women
American people of Pennsylvania Dutch descent